Memoirs of a Good-for-Nothing is a novella by Joseph von Eichendorff. Completed in 1823, it was first printed in 1826. The work is regarded as a pinnacle of musical prose. Eichendorff created an open form with epic and lyrical elements, incorporating several poems and songs in the text. It was first published in English in 1866.

Plot 
A miller sends his son away, calling him a good-for-nothing. The young man takes his fiddle along and leaves happily, without a specific destination. Soon two ladies in a carriage, who are interested in his music, take him along to their palace close to Vienna, where he gets a job as a gardener. He falls in love with the younger lady. Promoted to tax collector, he plants flowers in the garden of the tax house instead of potatoes, placing them regularly for his beloved. He plans to make money, but when he sees his beloved with an officer, he realizes that she is not available for him and leaves.

Further travel takes him to Italy, with adventures on the way and in Rome. Back at the palace, several mysteries about identities are revealed, and he can marry his beloved Aurelie, who is not a noble woman but an orphan. The couple are given a house with a garden and vineyards, and they plan a honeymoon in Italy, travelling again.

Narration 
The story is told in the first person from the perspective of the young man. The story has fairy-tale elements in its simple and intentionally naive language, unexpected events, and images of romantic landscapes. The young man's "Wanderlust" is motivated externally by his father and internally by his desire for the "weite Welt" ("big, wide world"), fleeing sedentary life. Combining elements of dream and reality, it has been called a "high point of Romantic fiction".

Legacy 
The poem "Der Taugenichts" by Gottfried Keller was inspired by the novella.

The novella was freely translated to English as Memoirs of a Good-for-Nothing, first by Charles Godfrey Leland, published in New York in 1866 by Leypohlt & Holt. A translation by Bayard Quincy Morgan was published in New York by Ungar in 1955. A translation by John Calder was first published in 1966 and reprinted in 2015 by Alma Books.

The novella has been the basis for three films. The Rome episode was cut, possibly to avoid nurturing any desires to travel by residents of the GDR.  is a 1978 coproduction with television, directed by Bernhard Sinkel with Jacques Breuer in the title role and music by Hans Werner Henze. It was broadcast several times on ZDF and was awarded the Deutscher Filmpreis in 1978.

Editions

First edition 
Joseph von Eichendorff: Aus dem Leben eines Taugenichts und das Marmorbild. Zwei Novellen nebst einem Anhange von Liedern und Romanzen. Berlin: Vereinsbuchhandlung 1826, 278 pages, plus 3 without page numbers for advertisement of the publisher.

Later editions 
 Joseph von Eichendorff: Aus dem Leben eines Taugenichts. Hamburger Lesehefte Verlag, Husum 2016,  (= 5th Hamburger Leseheft).
 Joseph von Eichendorff: Aus dem Leben eines Taugenichts. Novelle. Anaconda, Cologne 2006, .
 Joseph von Eichendorff: Aus dem Leben eines Taugenichts, edited by Max Kämper. Reclam, Stuttgart 2015,  (= Reclam XL, Band 19238:  Text und Kontext).
 Joseph von Eichendorff: Aus dem Leben eines Taugenichts. Novelle. Ed. Joseph Kiermeier-Debre. dtv, Munich 1997,  (= dtv 2605: Bibliothek der Erstausgaben).
 Joseph von Eichendorff: Aus dem Leben eines Taugenichts. Novelle. Commentary by Peter Höfle. Suhrkamp, Frankfurt am Main 2006,  (= Suhrkamp-BasisBibliothek, Vol. 82).

Literature 
 Otto Eberhardt: Eichendorffs Taugenichts – Quellen und Bedeutungshintergrund. Untersuchungen zum poetischen Verfahren Eichendorffs. Königshausen und Neumann, Würzburg 2000, .
 Otto Eberhardt: War Aurelie in Eichendorffs „Taugenichts“ wirklich zunächst als verheiratete Gräfin gedacht? Zu einer These Karl Konrad Polheims. In: Archiv für das Studium der neueren Sprachen und Literaturen, Vol. 248, 2011, pp. 322–332.
 Walpurga Freund-Spork: Joseph von Eichendorff: Aus dem Leben eines Taugenichts. Königs Erläuterungen: Textanalyse und Interpretation (Vol. 215). C. Bange Verlag, Hollfeld 2011, .
 Christian Klein: Eichendorff und „Flower Power“. Der Taugenichts als Kultbuch der Hippie-Bewegung? In: Aurora. Jahrbuch der Eichendorff-Gesellschaft 2008/2009. De Gruyter, Berlin/New York 2010, pp. 89–102, .
 Friedhelm Klöhr: Joseph von Eichendorff. Aus dem Leben eines Taugenichts (= Interpretationshilfe Deutsch). Stark-Verlag, Freising 1999, .
 Gunnar Och: Der Taugenichts und seine Leser. Anmerkungen zur Rezeption eines Kultbuches. In: Anne Bohnenkamp und Ursula Regener (Hrsg.): Eichendorff wieder finden. Joseph von Eichendorff 1788–1857. Katalog zur Ausstellung im Freien Deutschen Hochstift. Gleichzeitig: Aurora. Jahrbuch der Eichendorff-Gesellschaft 66/67. Freies Deutsches Hochstift, Frankfurt 2007, pp. 87–109.
 Theodor Pelster: Lektürehilfe zu: Joseph von Eichendorff, Aus dem Leben eines Taugenichts, Reclam, Stuttgart 2001, .
 Hartwig Schulz: Erläuterungen und Dokumente zu: Josepf von Eichendorff, Aus dem Leben eines Taugenichts. Reclam,  Stuttgart 2001, .

References

External links 

 
 Aus dem Leben eines Taugenichts: Novelle by Freiherr von Joseph Eichendorff Gutenberg
 Aus dem Leben eines Taugenichts und das Marmorbild, Berlin 1826.  – Volldigitalisat in der Digitalen Bibliothek Mecklenburg-Vorpommern
 Aus dem Leben eines Taugenichts ZENO
 
 Joseph von Eichendorff / Aus dem Leben eines Taugenichts / Novelle (PDF; 507 kB)
 Carel ter Haar: Aus dem Leben eines Taugenichts. Kommentar, Materialien (PDF; 504 kB)
 … floating on a sea of milk and honey / Memoirs of a good-for-nothing, by Joseph von Eichendorff pechorinsjournal.wordpress.com 9 February 2010

1826 German novels
German novellas
Works by Joseph von Eichendorff